Sergei Nikolayevich Krutov (born 18 April 1969) is a former Russian professional footballer.

Club career
He made his professional debut in the Soviet Second League in 1988 for PFC CSKA-2 Moscow. He played 1 game in the UEFA Cup 1993–94 for FC Dynamo Moscow.

Honours
 Soviet Top League runner-up: 1990.
 Russian Premier League bronze: 1993.
 Soviet Cup winner: 1991.
 Soviet Cup finalist: 1992.
 Russian Cup finalist: 1993.

References

1969 births
Footballers from Moscow
Living people
Soviet footballers
Russian footballers
Association football midfielders
PFC CSKA Moscow players
Russian Premier League players
SBV Vitesse players
FC Dynamo Moscow players
FC Tyumen players
FC Chernomorets Novorossiysk players
Russian expatriate footballers
Expatriate footballers in the Netherlands
Eredivisie players
Soviet Top League players
FC Yenisey Krasnoyarsk players